Absecon may refer to:

Geography 
Absecon, New Jersey, a city in Atlantic County, New Jersey
Absecon (NJT station), a New Jersey Transit train station in Absecon, New Jersey
Absecon Highlands, New Jersey, an unincorporated community within Galloway Township
Absecon Inlet, an inlet north of Atlantic City, New Jersey
Absecon Island, on the coast of Atlantic County, New Jersey
Absecon Light, in Atlantic City, New Jersey
Absecon Public School District, in Atlantic County, New Jersey

Ships 
USCGC Absecon (WAVP-374), later WHEC-374, a United States Coast Guard cutter in commission from 1949 to 1972
USS Absecon, the name of more than one United States Navy ship